Khuda e Dad Sheher is a small village in Kohlu district in the Balochistan province of Pakistan.

It is named after Mir Khudaidad Khan Marri, who established the village.

Populated places in Kohlu District